Censorship of LGBT issues is practised by a number of countries around the world. They may take a variety of forms, including anti-LGBT curriculum laws in the United States, the Russian gay propaganda law (on "promotion of non-traditional sexual relationships"), and the Hungarian anti-LGBT law (on "content portraying or promoting sex reassignment or homosexuality"), and laws in Muslim-majority states such as Saudi Arabia, Pakistan, and Malaysia prohibiting advocacy that offends Islamic morality.

Current laws

Afghanistan
On November 21, 2021, Afghanistan's Ministry for the Propagation of Virtue and the Prevention of Vice promulgated an order prohibiting TV channels from broadcasting media that are against the Taliban's interpretation of Sharia and Afghan culture.

Algeria 

Article 333 bis of the Penal Code, as amended on 13 February 1982 by Law n° 82-04, criminalizes the distribution of anything against "decency" with up to 2 years in prison and a fine up to 2,000 dinars. Article 333, also amended in 1982, criminalizes indecent exposure of any "act against the order of nature with an individual of the same sex" with up to 3 years in prison and a fine up to 10,000 dinars.

China

On 31 December 2015, the State Administration of Press, Publication, Radio, Film and Television (SARFT) of the People's Republic of China announced a new rule that banned any television show and film depicting "unnormal sexual relationships", including homosexuality. As a result of this new rule, many popular web television series at the time like Addicted and Go Princess Go were immediately pulled from broadcasting. Online streaming services including LETV and Tencent Video followed the new rule by deleting or censoring web series with LGBT characters.

In 2017, an LGBT conference was scheduled to be held in Xi'an. Western reports, using the organisers blog as their source, claimed the police had detained the organisers and threatened them.

In March 2018, Oscar-winning drama Call Me By Your Name has been pulled from the Beijing International Film Festival's lineup. It was widely speculated that the organizer of this festival was under political pressure to not show the film.

On 14 April 2018, Sina Weibo, the equivalent of Twitter in China, announced a crackdown on LGBT content, as pursuant to the China Internet Security Law and other government regulations.

In May 2018, the European Broadcasting Union blocked Mango TV, one of China's most watched channels, from airing the final of the Eurovision Song Contest 2018 after it edited out Irish singer Ryan O'Shaughnessy's performance, which depicted two male dancers, and blacked out rainbow flags during Switzerland's performance.

Days before the International Day Against Homophobia in 2018, two women wearing rainbow badges were attacked and beaten by security guards in Beijing. The security company dismissed the three guards involved shortly thereafter.

Mr. Gay China, a beauty pageant, was held in 2016 without incident. In 2018, the event host passively cancelled their engagement by not responding to any communications. Mr Gay World 2019 announced the cancellation of the Hong Kong event after communication began to deteriorate in early August. No official censorship notice was issued but some articles blamed the Chinese Government for the cancellation. That same year, a woman who wrote a gay-themed novel was sentenced to 10 years and 6 months in prison for "breaking obscenity laws".

Hungary

In June 2021, the government of Hungary introduced a bill prohibiting the showing of "any content portraying or promoting sex reassignment or homosexuality" to minors, similar to the Russian gay propaganda law. On 15 June, the National Assembly approved the law by a vote of 157-1. The President of Hungary signed the bill into law on June 23rd. Seventeen EU member states (Belgium, the Netherlands, Luxembourg, Denmark, Estonia, Finland, France, Germany, Ireland, Lithuania, Spain, Sweden, Latvia, Greece, Cyprus, Italy and Austria) and several LGBT and human rights organisations condemned the law and called it a breach of the Charter of Fundamental Rights of the European Union.

Indonesia 

On 23 February 2016, the Indonesian Broadcasting Commission (KPI) released the "Circular to All Broadcasting Companies on Effeminate Men", banning the portrayal of sexual and gender diversity in men by the broadcasting companies. In the same month, the KPI also banned TV and radio programs that "promoted homosexual lifestyle" claiming that they constituted a violation of the 2012 Broadcasting Program Standards.

Lithuania

Paraguay 

On 5 October 2017, the Minister of Education and Science Enrique Riera signed Resolution N° 29664, which prohibits the use of printed and digital materials referring to "gender theory and/or ideology" in educational institutions. Enrique Riera later said he would volunteer to "burn the books in a public square if they contained gender ideology". The Inter-American Commission on Human Rights expressed its concern about the decision and declared that "these types of measures represent a serious omission of the duty of the State to protect children from all forms of violence and discrimination, in all spheres, and especially in school".

Russia

In Russia, the Law for the Purpose of Protecting Children from Information Advocating for a Denial of Traditional Family Values was unanimously approved by the State Duma on 11 June 2013 (with just one MP abstaining—Ilya Ponomarev), and was signed into law by President Vladimir Putin on 30 June 2013.

The Russian government's stated purpose for the law is to prevent children from being exposed to homosexuality—content presenting homosexuality as being a norm in society—under the argument that it contradicts traditional family values. The statute amended the country's child protection law and the Code of the Russian Federation on Administrative Offenses, to make the distribution of "propaganda of non-traditional sexual relationships" among minors, an offence punishable by fines. This definition includes materials that "raises interest in" such relationships; cause minors to "form non-traditional sexual predispositions"; or "[present] distorted ideas about the equal social value of traditional and non-traditional sexual relationships." Businesses and organisations can also be forced to temporarily cease operations if convicted under the law, and foreigners may be arrested and detained for up to 15 days then deported, or fined up to 5,000 rubles and deported.

The Kremlin's backing of the law appealed to the Russian nationalist far-right, and also gained broad support among the Russian public and the Russian Orthodox Church, with 70% of Russians officially being Russian-Orthodox. The law was condemned by the Venice Commission of the Council of Europe (of which Russia is a member), by the United Nations Committee on the Rights of the Child and by human rights groups, such as Amnesty International and Human Rights Watch. The statute was criticised for its broad and ambiguous wording (including the broadly worded "raises interest in" and "among minors"), which critics described as an effective ban on publicly promoting the rights and culture of the LGBT community. The law was also  condemned for leading to an increase  in, and justification of, homophobic violence, while the implications of the law in relation to the then-upcoming 2014 Winter Olympics being hosted by Sochi were also cause for concern, as the Olympic Charter contains language explicitly barring various forms of discrimination.

Singapore 

Singapore has a series of laws and regulations that restrict LGBT topics in the media. The Infocomm Media Development Authority bans any film, television program, advertisement or video game which "promote or glamorize homosexuality", if the "homosexual content is discreet in treatment and not gratuitous" they can instead be classified as restricted to people aged 18 or over. Films can also be restricted to people aged 21 or over if their main themes are same-sex marriage or parenting.

United States (sub-national)

Several U.S. states have "no promo homo laws", which prohibit or limit the mention or discussion of homosexuality and transgender identity in public schools. In theory, these laws mainly apply to sex education courses, but they can also be applied to other parts of the school curriculum as well as to extracurricular activities and groups such as gay–straight alliances.

These explicit anti-LGBT curriculum laws can be found in six US states, namely Florida (for kindergarten to grade 3 and instruction that is considered "not age appropriate or developmentally appropriate for students" in any grade), Alabama (For kindergarten to grade 5), Louisiana, Mississippi, Oklahoma, and Texas. Five other states (Montana, Arizona, Arkansas, Tennessee and Florida) require parental notification of instruction on LGBTQ issues and allows parents to opt-out of such instruction.

They are similar to the now-repealed section 28 of the British Local Government Act 1988, which prohibited local authorities from "intentionally promoting homosexuality, publishing material with the intention of promoting homosexuality, or promoting the teaching in any maintained school of the acceptability of homosexuality as a pretended family relationship."

States that have repealed their "no homo promo" laws include Alabama (since 29 April 2021), Arizona (since 1 July 2019), North Carolina (since 2006), South Carolina (since 12 March 2020) and Utah (since 1 July 2017).

Repealed laws

Australia (sub-national)

In December 1989 in the state of Western Australia, the Parliament of Western Australia passed the Law Reform (Decriminalisation of Sodomy) Act 1989 which decriminalised private gay sex while making it a crime for a person to "...promote or encourage homosexual behaviour as part of the teaching in any primary or secondary educational institutions..." or make public policy with respect to the undefined promotion of homosexual behaviour. It was repealed in 2002 via the Acts Amendment (Gay and Lesbian Law Reform) Act 2002, which also repealed the laws with respect to promotion of homosexual behaviour in public policy and in educational institutions.

Romania

"Article 200" (Articolul 200 in Romanian) was a section of the Penal Code of Romania that criminalised homosexual relationships. It was introduced in 1968 under the communist regime of Nicolae Ceauşescu. Under pressure from the Council of Europe, it was amended on 14 November 1996, when homosexual sex in private between two consenting adults was decriminalised. However, the amended Article 200 continued to criminalise same-sex relationships if they were displayed publicly or caused a "public scandal". It also continued to ban the promotion of homosexual activities, as well as the formation of gay-centred organisations (including LGBT rights organisations). It was repealed by the Năstase government on 22 June 2001.

South Korea
In 2001, South Korea's Ministry of Information and Communication's Information and Communications Ethics Committee began censoring online LGBT content, but it stopped the practice in 2003.

United Kingdom

"Section 28" or "Clause 28" of the Local Government Act 1988 caused the addition of "Section 2A" to the Local Government Act 1986, which affected England, Wales and Scotland. The amendment was enacted on 24 May 1988, and stated that a local authority "shall not intentionally promote homosexuality or publish material with the intention of promoting homosexuality" or "promote the teaching in any maintained school of the acceptability of homosexuality as a pretended family relationship".

The law's existence caused many groups to close or limit their activities or self-censor. For example, a number of lesbian, gay and bisexual student support groups in schools and colleges across Britain were closed owing to fears by council legal staff that they could breach the act.

It was repealed on 21 June 2000 in Scotland by the Ethical Standards in Public Life etc. (Scotland) Act 2000, one of the first pieces of legislation enacted by the new Scottish Parliament, and on 18 November 2003 in the rest of the United Kingdom by section 122 of the Local Government Act 2003.

Notes

References

See also
Censorship
LGBT rights by country or territory
LGBT social movements

 
LGBT rights